TAPS ([tris(hydroxymethyl)methylamino]propanesulfonic acid) is a chemical compound commonly used to make buffer solutions. 

It can bind divalent cations, including Co(II) and Ni(II).

TAPS is effective to make buffer solutions in the pH range 7.7–9.1, since it has a pKa value of 8.44  (ionic strength I = 0, 25 °C). 

The pH (and pKa at I ≠ 0) of the buffer solution changes with concentration and temperature, and this effect may be predicted e.g. using online calculators.

References 

Buffer solutions
Sulfonic acids
Triols